"Our Fair City" is a fantasy short story by Robert A. Heinlein, originally printed in Weird Tales, January 1949. The story involves an old parking lot attendant, his pet whirlwind (named Kitten), and a muckraking newspaper columnist who decide to "clean up" their city's corrupt government by running the whirlwind for political office.

Reception
Alexei Panshin has called it an "amiable trifle", while Brian Stableford has described it as an example of "preliminary de-historicization followed by re-accommodation to American pragmatism".

Origins

Heinlein biographer William H. Patterson Jr. noted that Heinlein wrote the story in four days in October 1947, inspired by L. Ron Hubbard's decision to name a dust devil which was frequently present outside Heinlein's apartment.

References

1948 short stories
Short stories by Robert A. Heinlein
Works originally published in Weird Tales